is a Japanese model and actress. She is previously married to Haruichi Shindō, one of the members of the Japanese rock band Porno Graffitti.

On May 30, 2009 she gave birth to a boy. On January 25, 2012 she gave birth to a girl.

Appearances

TV dramas
Big Money! (2001)
Sutaa no Koi (2001)
Pretty Girls (2002)
Kowloon de Aimashō (2002)
Kanojotachi no Kurisumasu (2002)
Itsumo futari de (2003)
Boku dake no Madonna (2003)
Wonderful Life (2004)
Three Extremes (Box) (2004)
Fuyu no Undōkai (2005)
M no Higeki (2005)
Dragon Zakura (2005)
Female (2005)
Sanae Oishii puropōzu (2006)
Kōmyō ga Tsuji (2006), Hosokawa Gracia
Karei naru Ichizoku (2007)
Scandal (2008)
Rain Fall (2009)
Angel Bank as Ino Mamako (2010)
Boss 2 (2011)
Ranma 1/2 (2011)
Yae no Sakura (2013)
Haitatsu Saretai Watashitachi (2013)
Oh, My Dad!! (2013)
Saigo Kara Nibanme no Koi (2014)
Petero no Sōretsu (2014)
Mother Game: Kanojotachi no Kaikyū (2015)
Innocent Days (2018)
Bakabon no Papa yori Baka na Papa (2018)
The Supporting Actors 3 (2021), Herself
Fishbowl Wives (2022)

Films
Three...Extremes (2004)
Female (2005)
Jiyuu renai (2005)
Taitei no ken (2006)
Ai no Rukeichi (2007)
Rain Fall (2009)
Sakurada Mongai no Hen (2010)
Black Widow Business (2016)
And Then There Was Light (2017)
You Shine in the Moonlit Night (2019)

Bibliography

Magazines
 CanCam, Shogakukan 1982-, as an exclusive model from 1997 to 2002

Photobooks
 Kyōfū (March 2001, Wani Books) 
 Ariko and Takay, Key of Life (5 September 2003, Penguin Shobō)

References

External links
 
 
 JMDb Profile (in Japanese)

1978 births
Living people
Actors from Chiba Prefecture
Japanese television personalities
Japanese actresses
Japanese female models
Models from Chiba Prefecture
20th-century Japanese women
21st-century Japanese women